Hyochang Park Station is a subway station on Seoul Subway Line 6 and the Gyeongui–Jungang Line. It is named after Hyochang Park, which is most notable for housing the Hyochang Stadium, a small field capable of hosting sports events. The Yongsan District Office is also nearby.

Station layout

Vicinity
Exit 1: Hyochang Park, Hyochang Stadium, Geumyang Elementary School
Exit 2: Yongsan District Office
Exit 3: Namjeong Elementary School
Exit 4: Yongmun Market

References 

Railway stations opened in 2000
Seoul Metropolitan Subway stations
Metro stations in Yongsan District